John Heaviside Clark (c.1771–1863) was a Scottish aquatint engraver and painter of seascapes and landscapes. He was also known as Waterloo Clark, because of the sketches he made on the field directly after the Battle of Waterloo.

Clark exhibited regularly at the Royal Academy between 1801 and 1832. He was the author of A practical essay on the art of Colouring and Painting Landscapes, with illustrations, published in 1807, and A practical Illustration of Gilpin's Day, with thirty colour plates, based on monochrome studies representing different times of day by William Gilpin, in 1824.

He died in Edinburgh in 1863.

References

Sources
 

Place of birth unknown
Year of birth uncertain
1771 births
19th-century artists
18th-century Scottish people
19th-century Scottish people
19th-century Scottish painters
Scottish male painters
1863 deaths
19th-century Scottish male artists